Chamaesphecia dumonti is a moth of the family Sesiidae. It is found from France to southern Russia and the Caucasus and from Germany south to Italy and the Balkan Peninsula., It is also found in western Turkey.

The wingspan is 18–20 mm.

The larvae feed on Stachys recta, Stachys germanica, Stachys atherocaly, Stachys caucasica and Stachys plumosa.

References

Moths described in 1922
Sesiidae
Moths of Europe